IMANA may refer to:

Imana, a deity in African mythology
The Islamic Medical Association of North America, headquartered in Lombard, Illinois
CS Imana, a football club in Matadi, Democratic Republic of Congo